Sesheke is a constituency of the National Assembly of Zambia. It covers Sesheke and surrounding towns in Sesheke District of Western Province.

List of MPs

References 

Constituencies of the National Assembly of Zambia 
1964 establishments in Zambia 
Constituencies established in 1964